Adolfino Cañete Azcurra (born 13 September 1956) is a retired professional Paraguayan footballer. He was part of the 1986 Paraguay national team that played in the World Cup that year at Mexico. Cañete was credited with three assists during that World Cup.

Career
Cañete played for many clubs during his career, including Mexican side Cruz Azul and in Argentina, Ferro Carril Oeste, Talleres de Córdoba and Club Atlético Lanús. Cañete played in the central midfield for Ferro during the early 1980s, helping the club win its first two Argentine Primera División titles: the Torneo Nacional in 1982 and 1984.

Cañete made 29 appearances for the Paraguay national football team from 1985 to 1989.

References

External links

1956 births
Living people
Paraguayan footballers
Paraguayan expatriate footballers
Paraguay international footballers
1986 FIFA World Cup players
1987 Copa América players
1989 Copa América players
Liga MX players
Cruz Azul footballers
Unión Magdalena footballers
Cobreloa footballers
Ferro Carril Oeste footballers
Talleres de Córdoba footballers
Club Atlético Lanús footballers
Textil Mandiyú footballers
Club Atlético Colón footballers
Expatriate footballers in Argentina
Expatriate footballers in Chile
Expatriate footballers in Mexico
Paraguayan expatriate sportspeople in Argentina
Paraguayan expatriate sportspeople in Chile
Paraguayan expatriate sportspeople in Mexico
Sportspeople from Asunción
Association football midfielders